Big B may refer to:

 Amitabh Bachchan or Big B, Indian actor
 Big B Drugs, a defunct American drugstore chain
 Big B (film), a 2007 Malayalam film 
 Big B (rapper), American rapper
 A character in the Infernal Affairs film series
 Buckethead, an American guitarist

See also
 Biggby Coffee, pronounced big-B